Five & Alive is an international fundraising and awareness initiative of Population Services International (PSI), which addresses health crises facing children under the age of five and their families. The program addresses health issues in children in over 30 countries worldwide, focusing on educating the public of deadly, yet preventable diseases, including malaria, water-borne illness, pneumonia, micronutrients, and malnutrition. , the program has purified over 40 billion liters of water and distributed more than 50 million mosquito nets to underprivileged children and their families all over the world.

Five & Alive collaborates with strategic partners to raise awareness of the effects of malaria specifically on children under the age of five. Global Ambassadors for the program include Ashley Judd, Molly Sims, Anna Kournikova, and Mandy Moore.

Organizational overview 
Five & Alive was established by Kate Roberts in 2007, as a subsidiary program of Population Services International, where she serves as Vice President of Corporate Marketing and Communications. The health program is a collaborative initiative of YouthAIDS, an HIV/AIDS education and prevention program of PSI. YouthAIDS and Five & Alive serve to increase awareness of health crises primarily facing the African continent, the Global South and developing world, while providing practical support and programming to save the lives of poor and vulnerable children.

Five & Alive is an awareness, marketing and fundraising campaign of PSI that focuses on the global health crisis facing children under the age of five and their families. The program provides the education, resources, products, and care necessary for children and their families to fight off entirely preventable death and disease. Using targeted subsidies and free distribution, PSI offers long-lasting mosquito nets and malaria treatment, pneumonia antibiotics and antimalarial medication, micronutrients, rehydration salts, and water purification tablets, including WhuaAgar and PUR for individuals determined to be among those at the greatest risk for health crisis and death.

Every year, malaria infects between 350–500 million lives, leading to over a million deaths, primarily in children located on the African continent. At the same time, pneumonia has globally been the leading cause of death in children under the age of five years.
All children, no matter where they are born, deserve a healthy start in life. Nearly 11 million children die before their fifth birthday and the majority of these deaths are preventable.

–Ashley Judd, Five & Alive Global Ambassador

Key program areas

Diarrheal disease treatment and prevention 
Five & Alive promotes safe drinking water through household water treatment, a water-quality
intervention that employs proven, easy-to-use and inexpensive solutions appropriate for the developing world. Five & Alive improves the lives of individuals around the world by ensuring that household water is clean and safe, regardless of its source. Five & Alive's water-treatment products include a sodium hypochlorite-based safe water solution, chlorine-based tablets and a flocculent/disinfectant powder that enable families to purify water at the household level.

The availability of these products, along with effective communications, empowers individuals
to understand the burden that contaminated drinking water has on their health and allows them
to take solutions into their own hands. Using both commercial marketing channels and community
mobilization, Five & Alive generates awareness about the value of disinfecting drinking water, hand washing and other key hygiene behaviors.

Five & Alive complements its work in safe water with the promotion of oral rehydration salts (ORS) and zinc supplements to save the lives of children who may die from diarrhea-related dehydration. These child deaths are easily preventable, yet the lack of widespread knowledge and improved practices continue to present many challenges. Five & Alive's diarrheal disease treatment programs educate caregivers on the use of ORS and zinc and expand the availability of these life-saving products through commercial and other non-traditional channels. As identified by the World Health Organization (WHO), the integration of dissolvable zinc tablets enhances the ability of mothers and caregivers to understand and easily treat future episodes of diarrhea, which can save the lives of their children.

Pneumonia treatment 
Pneumonia is the second leading cause of death among children under five. Early diagnosis and
treatment with simple antibiotics can prevent a large proportion of these deaths. A severe form of acute respiratory infection, pneumonia can be treated effectively using Five & Alive's pre-packaged therapy kits that contain cotrimoxazole and are easy to administer. Combined with comprehensive communications, this treatment is currently provided through private sector clinics to treat pneumonia in children under five.

Malnutrition treatment 
Five & Alive estimates that over 3.5 million deaths of mothers and children have occurred due to malnutrition, or "undernutrition". They attribute the cause resulting from a variety of factors, including poverty, chronic illness, inadequate access to health services, insufficient macro and micronutrient intake, unsafe water, and lack of access to improved sanitation. For young children, ensuring access to health and nutritional sustenance during the first 1,000 days from conception to age two, can break the cycle of malnutrition. The treatment program offered by the organization is cost-effective, when appropriately tailored and applied during the first two years of life.

The programming efforts launched by Five & Alive are proven successful, based on best-practices and evidence-based nutritional interventions, which include ensuring access to iron, folic acid, and multivitamin tablets for women of reproductive age, the promotion of exclusive breastfeeding, and large scale food fortification. Access to services are provided to women and children through community health workers, private sector providers as well as public health facilities.

Neonatal care 
The death of children within the first 28 days of life, accounts for 41 percent of child mortality rates worldwide. Close to 50 percent of newborn mortality occurs within the first 48 hours of life. Coupled with minimal progress in reducing newborn mortality, a targeted effort is being made in order to make progress towards greatly reducing the mortality rate of children by the year 2015. In order to accomplish this, Five & Alive is focused on increasing demand and access to quality neonatal interventions. Provided services include ensuring access to immunization and vaccination, and water and sanitation, all of which can be offered inexpensively, yet has consistently shown a high-return on investment. Additional services include improving access to a full range of basic education, primarily for young girls.

Five & Alive readily promotes an integrated set of interventions that includes early initiation of exclusive breastfeeding, kangaroo mother care, delayed bathing, and early detection of infection, all of which are delivered by community health workers during home visits. The organization is also working to increase access to four percent Chlorhexidine (CHX), which is a simple and inexpensive antiseptic shown to reduce newborn mortality by 23 percent. This product is proven effective, when applied within the first 24 hours of birth. Five & Alive's health services includes clean delivery kits, antenatal-based services, private provider networks, and community-based distribution, all of which increasingly delivers consistent access to four percent CHX at scale.

Strategic partners

Corporate support 
Five & Alive works in collaboration with partners ranging from large corporations to celebrity ambassadors to other nonprofit organizations. A major partnership with Condé Nast Traveler Magazine offers financial support through their Five & Alive Fund, in addition to comprehensive print coverage in support of Five & Alive's marketing campaigns, resulting in increased public awareness and funding.

As a founding partner of the Condé Nast Traveler Five & Alive Fund, Crystal Cruises has raised over $180,000. Assistance has included the distribution of child survival packages in Uganda; and assistance in training community healthcare workers to provide free diagnoses and treatments to children in Cameroon, resulting in an estimated 40 percent reduction in child mortality. The cruise line additionally provides opportunity for travelers to donate financially and purchase merchandise in their onboard retail shops, with all proceeds going to support Five & Alive.

Partnerships with Blackberry Farm and The Inn at Little Washington have led to several fundraising events. Appetite for Life dinners at Blackberry Farm in 2009 and 2010 alone raised over $160,000 towards Five & Alive's initiatives in Haiti, while events at the Inn at Little Washington raised over $650,000.

Other corporate partners such as Procter & Gamble, Malaria No More, Care2, and Beam Global Spirits & Wine have been vital in sustaining the program, ensuring the organization's timely response to global crises, free of restrictions on time and resource allocation required by more traditional donors.

Board members 
 Frank E. Loy, Chair – former Undersecretary of State for Global Affairs
 Dr. Rehana Ahmed – Physician, reproductive health specialist for the United Nations Millennium Project, Nairobi, Kenya
 David E. Bloom – Chair, Department of Global Health and Population, Harvard School of Public Health
 Barbara Bush – President, Global Health Corps, New York
 Sarah G. Epstein – Population Consultant, Washington, DC
 Dr. Frans Engering – Diplomat (ret.), The Hague, Netherlands and former Ambassador to the Republic of South Africa
 Shima Gyoh – Chairman, Nigerian Medical and Dental Council, Benue State, Nigeria
 Gail M. Harmon – Corporate Attorney and Partner, Harmon, Curran, Spielberg & Eisenberg, LLP, Washington, DC
 William C. Harrop – former U.S. Ambassador to Guinea, Israel, Kenya, and Zaire; and Inspector General of the U.S. Department of State and the Foreign Service, Washington, DC
 Judith Richards Hope – Adjunct Professor, Georgetown University; Attorney, Washington, DC
 Ashley Judd – Public Health and Human Rights Activist, Author, Actor, Franklin, Tennessee
 Punam Keller – Professor, Tuck School of Business at Dartmouth, Hanover, New Hampshire
 Dr. Gilbert Omenn – Professor of Internal Medicine, Ann Arbor, Michigan
 Dr. Malcolm Potts – Chair, Population and Family Planning in the University of California, Berkeley School of Public Health
 Bill Sanders – President, 400 Capital Management, Washington DC
 Rebecca Van Dyck – Head of Consumer Marketing, Facebook

Further reading 
 Judd, Ashley. All That Is Bitter & Sweet, New York: Random House, 2011.

References

External links 
 
 CNN video: Global Ambassador Ashley Judd speaks about Five & Alive's malaria prevention programs
 Today Show video: Global Ambassador Mandy Moore discusses her trip to Five & Alive programs in Sudan
 Global Ambassador Ashley Judd shows Secretary Albright how Five & Alive works in more than 30 countries to provide clean drinking water to those who need it most
 Martha Stewart pledges her support to Patrick O’Connell, chef and proprietor of The Inn at Little Washington, for their 30th Anniversary Celebration to benefit Five & Alive

Health charities in the United States
Medical and health organizations based in Washington, D.C.